The office of Lord Lieutenant of Gwent was created on 1 April 1974 as the Monarch's representative covering the newly formed administrative county of Gwent. By virtue of S.I 1973/1754, the existing Lord Lieutenant of Monmouthshire became the first Lord Lieutenant of Gwent.

Following the abolition of Gwent in 1996 by the Local Government (Wales) Act 1994, the area was redefined as a preserved county. This was subsequently modified to its present area by S.I 2003/974.

Lord Lieutenants of Gwent
Before 1974 – see Lord Lieutenant of Monmouthshire
Col. Edward Roderick Hill1 April 1974 –
Sir Richard Hanbury-Tenison, of Clytha Park 25 June 1979 – 22 October 2001
Sir Simon Boyle 22 October 2001 – 23 March 2016

Brigadier Robert Aitken 24 March 2016

References

Gwent (county)
Caerphilly County Borough
Gwent
Lord-Lieutenants of Gwent
1974 establishments in Wales